The native form of this personal name is Hernádi Zsolt. This article uses Western name order when mentioning individuals.
Zsolt Hernádi (born November 30, 1960) is a Hungarian businessman and the Chairman-CEO of MOL Plc., the Hungarian Oil & Gas company, since 2001.

Early life and education
Zsolt Hernádi was born in Tarján on November 30, 1960. He grew up in Esztergom, where he spent his student years. First he was a student of Kossuth Lajos Elementary School, then he graduated from the mathematics department of the Dobó Katalin High School. Hernádi graduated from the Faculty of Industrial Planning and Analysis at the Corvinus University of Budapest (with a degree in economics) in 1986. As a freshly graduated student he became a trainee at Deutsche Bank in Germany.

Career 
Zsolt Hernádi started his professional career at Unicbank and subsequently held various positions at the Kereskedelmi és Hitelbank (K&H) between 1989 and 1994, becoming Deputy general manager in 1992. Between 1994 and 2001, Hernádi then served as the CEO of the Magyar Takarékszövetkezeti Bank (Takarékbank).

MOL 
Hernádi joined MOL in 1999. He has been a member of MOL's board of directors since February 1999. In July 2000, he was elected chairman of the board and has served as chairman-CEO of MOL since June 11, 2001. Under Hernádi's leadership, MOL developed from a local Hungarian company to an international company in the oil and gas industry, with the firm's earnings growing seven-fold from $2.1 to $15.1 billion and market capitalization multiplying five-fold from $2.2 (data from December 2002) to $9.7 billion (data from January 2019). With Hernádi, the company has also adopted a new strategy, MOL Group 2030, built on the premise that demand for hydrocarbon-based motor fuels will gradually decline in the long run and with it is considered one of the first movers among the industry peers to acknowledge the expected weakening dominance of fossil fuels. 

During a hostile takeover attempt of MOL by OMV in 2007 and 2008, Hernádi was credited with playing a critical role in defending the company and securing MOL's independence.

Controversies
In 2011, Croatia started an investigation of ex-prime minister Ivo Sanader for allegedly accepting a €10 million bribe from MOL in exchange for the Croatian Government approving the First Amendment to the Shareholders Agreement and thus MOL securing management rights, also accusing the company's chairman Hernádi.

MOL repeatedly denied all the accusation. Soon after, the Hungarian prosecution launched an extensive investigation on suspicion of bribery and in 2012 dismissed all allegations of any criminal activity.

In 2014, the Croatian government initiated arbitration under UNCITRAL rules, seeking nullification of the First Amendment to the Shareholder's Agreement, claiming that MOL unlawfully obtained management rights. In 2016, UNCITRAL rejected all of Croatia's claims and cleared MOL of all accusations, including allegation of bribery and breaching the shareholder agreement. This was further confirmed by the Swiss Supreme Court. On December 20, 2019, the Zagreb County Court issued a first instance ruling in the Sander-Hernádi case, judging that the CEO of MOL was guilty of bribery and sentenced him to two years in prison.   MOL Group declared its disappointment with the judgement “as the existing decisions of the Hungarian authorities and those of the United Nations Tribunal in Geneva concluded that there was no wrongdoing by any MOL Group officer”. MOL declared full support of its board for Hernádi. The Hungarian government qualified the condemnation of Hernádi as political pressure. Two international legal scholars, Kai Ambos and David Anderson, Baron Anderson of Ipswich were appointed to independently monitor the fairness of the court case. The trial monitors accused the Croatian court of "bias" in support of Croatian "national interests" and violating internationally-recognised standards of fair trial, "including violating Article 6(1) of the European Convention on Human Rights (ECHR)." On January 29, 2020, the same Zagreb court overturned its 2018 detention order against Hernádi. The decision, which can be appealed by Croatia's chief prosecutor, could lead to a cancellation of the European arrest warrant for Hernádi and his removal from an Interpol wanted list.

Awards and recognitions
Hernádi was declared an Honorary Freeman of the city of Esztergom in 2007 and in September 2009, he was named Honorary Professor of Budapest Corvinus University. In 2010, Hernádi was honored with the Hungarian Order of Merit – Commander's Cross with Star of the Republic of Hungary, as a recognition for his efforts in diversifying and improving the security of supply in Central and Eastern Europe as well as his contribution to the development of MOL. In 2016, he was named the Honorary Citizen of the city of Százhalombatta and in 2017, was appointed as a member of the National Competitiveness Council in Hungary. In 2018, Zsolt Hernádi received the Titular University Professor title from Budapest Corvinus University.

According to the Influence Barometer he is the 13th most influential person in Hungary in 2020.

In 2021, the Budapest Stock Exchange awarded Hernádi the “Lifetime Achievement Award for the Development of the Hungarian Capital Market”, while Mol Nyrt. was awarded the “Responsibility, Sustainability and Responsible Corporate Governance Award”.

References 

1960 births
Living people
Hungarian chief executives
Hungarian economists
Hungarian billionaires
People from Komárom-Esztergom County
Corvinus University of Budapest alumni